Katarina Juli Naumanen (born 24 July 1995) is a Finnish footballer who plays as a defender for Kansallinen Liiga club FC Honka and the Finland women's national team.

References

1995 births
Living people
Finnish women's footballers
Women's association football defenders
Pallokissat players
Helsingin Jalkapalloklubi (women) players
Stabæk Fotball Kvinner players
FC Honka (women) players
Kansallinen Liiga players
Toppserien players
Finland women's international footballers
Finnish expatriate footballers
Finnish expatriate sportspeople in Norway
Expatriate women's footballers in Norway